Joëlle van Noppen (20 January 1980 – 12 May 2010) was a Dutch singer.

Career
Joëlle was born in Middelburg. She was a member of the Dutch girl group WOW! from 1997 to 2000. Until her death she was still active to a small extent as a cabaret singer in the band Copycat and performed salsa dancing.

Death
She died on 12 May 2010, aged 30, in the crash of Afriqiyah Airways Flight 771 in Tripoli, Libya.

References

1980 births
2010 deaths
People from Middelburg, Zeeland
20th-century Dutch women singers
Victims of aviation accidents or incidents in Libya
Victims of aviation accidents or incidents in 2010